Sori Siregar (born in Medan, Sumatra, on 12 November 1939) is an Indonesian writer whose full name is Sutan Sirovi Sori Siregar. After graduating his high school in Medan (1959), he continued his higher education in Medan and started writing in 1960. Since then he wrote short stories for 18 years, and wrote his first novel in 1980. He is a younger brother of Ridwan Siregar.

Life and work
Being active in literary world, he attended the Indonesian writers conference (Konferensi Karyawan Pengarang Seluruh Indonesia (KKPI) in Jakarta (1964), the Asian PEN Club conference in Taipei, Taiwan, the 37th International PEN Club conference in Seoul, Korea Selatan, and in 1970–1971 the International Writing Program, the University of Iowa, Iowa City, USA.  
He worked for RRI Nusantara III Medan (English Section, 1966–1972), BBC Radio London (Indonesia Section, 1972–1974), Radio Talivishen Malaysia, Kuala Lumpur (Indonesian section, 1975–1978) Kuala Lumpur, Radio Republik Indonesia (RRI) National Station Jakarta (1979–1982) and the Voice of America (Indonesian section, 1982–1985), Washington DC, USA. During his stay in Jakarta, he worked as an editor of several magazines as Times, Executive, Matra, Sarinah, Justice Forum and so on. He wrote short stories in various medias as Horizon , Kompas, Sarinah, The Jakarta Post, Media Indonesia, Bisnis Indonesia, Java Pos, Republika and so on.
He wrote short stories, two of which won the Jakarta Arts Council Award, which is Woman that is Mother and Telopon.  Both were published by Balai Pustaka. And also novel Initial climbing and two collection of short stories Meeting Point Jail are also published by Balai Pustaka. Another collection of short stories Among a Thousand Colors published by Pustaka Jaya and a collection of short stories Senja published by Nusa Indah, Flores. A latest collection of short stories "A While in This Life" was published in 2003 by Penerbit Progres(Progress Publishers), Jakarta. Furthermore, a short story collection "Kisah Abrukuwah" published by Kompas Gramedia Group.
He also translated many works of foreign literature including novels, short stories and dramas, into Indonesian. Some of the short stories are from authors such as Jorge Luis Borges, Erskine Caldwell, John Steinbeck, etc.

Publications

 Titik Temu (short stories, 1996)

References

External links
 Archive for the ‘Sori Siregar’ Category

1939 births
Living people
People from Medan
Indonesian writers
International Writing Program alumni
People of Batak descent